Shaded-pole synchronous motors are a class of AC motors.

Like a shaded pole induction motor, they use field coils with additional copper shading coils (see the illustration) to produce a weakly rotating magnetic field. But unlike a shaded pole induction motor (which uses a squirrel cage rotor), the synchronous version of this motor uses a magnetized rotor, e.g. a permanent magnet. This rotor rotates synchronously with the rotating magnetic field: if the rotor begins to lag behind the rotating field, driving torque increases and the rotor speeds up slightly until the rotor's position within the rotating field is a point where torque = drag; similarly, if the rotation of the field slows down, the rotor will advance relative to the field, torque will decline, or even become negative, slowing the speed of the rotor until it again reaches a position relative to the field where torque = drag.

Because of this, these motors are often used to drive electric clocks and, occasionally, phonograph turntables. In these applications, the speed of the motor is as accurate as the frequency of the mains power applied to the motor. These motors are also used in shavers.

Frequently, the rotor and its associated reduction geartrain are encased in an aluminium, copper, or plastic enclosure; the enclosed rotor is driven magnetically through the enclosure. Such geared motors are commonly available with the final output shaft or gear rotating from 600 RPM down to as low as 1/168 revolutions per hour (1 revolution per week!).

A further development dispenses with the shading rings altogether.  The application of power gives the magnetised rotor enough of a 'flick' to move it fast enough to establish synchronism.  A mechanical means prevents the rotor from starting in the wrong direction.  This design will only work satisfactorily if the standstill load is near to zero and has very little inertia.  This is similar to the motor used in quartz-timed mechanical clocks.

Starting issues and torque limitations

Even by the standards of shaded pole motors, the power output of these motors is usually very low. Because there is often no explicit starting mechanism, the rotor of a motor operating from a constant frequency mains supply must be very light so that it is capable of reaching running speed within one cycle of the mains frequency.   Alternatively, the rotor may be provided with a squirrel cage, so that the motor starts like an induction motor, once the rotor is pulled into synchronism with its magnet, the squirrel cage has no current induced in it and so plays no further part in the operation.

In more recent times, the use of variable frequency controls permits synchronous motors to start slowly and deliver more torque.

Further reading

 Institute of Electrical and Electronics Engineers, "Analysis and Control of subsynchronous resonance : presented at the IEEE Power Engineering Society 1976 winter meeting and Tesla symposium". Piscataway, N.J., IEEE, c1976.  76CH1066-O-PWR. LCCN 77153757 //r842

Electric motors